Kilbirnie South railway station was a railway station serving the town of Kilbirnie, North Ayrshire, Scotland as part of the Lanarkshire and Ayrshire Railway (L&AR).

History 

The station opened 2 December 1889 and was simply known as Kilbirnie. Upon the grouping of the L&AR into the London, Midland and Scottish Railway (LMS) in 1923, the station was renamed Kilbirnie South on 2 June 1924. The name change was to avoid confusion with the Glasgow and South Western Railway's nearby station of the same name, which was also incorporated into the LMS.

The station closed to passengers almost exactly forty one years after opening on 1 December 1930, with freight services withdrawing on the same day. By 1936 the station remained intact but was already overgrown.

Nothing remains of the station today.

Services 

A shuttle service ran from this station to Giffen and back, with around nine return journeys per day during the week and an extra two on Saturdays.

References

Notes

Sources 
 
 
 

Disused railway stations in North Ayrshire
Railway stations in Great Britain opened in 1889
Railway stations in Great Britain closed in 1930
Former Caledonian Railway stations